The Socialist Women's Union of Korea (formerly the Korean Democratic Women's Union, KDWU) is a mass organization for women in North Korea. Founded in 1945 as the North Korea Democratic Women's League, it is the oldest and one of the most important mass organizations in the country. The Union has committees on every level of administrative divisions of North Korea, from ri (village) all the way up to provinces.

Membership has been restricted to those women who are not members of any other mass organization. As a result, Union members are effectively composed of women who do not work outside of home. The Union nominally represents these women, but in reality it is used for the implementation of government policies. The Union has had an important role in achieving gender equality and increasing political participation of women in North Korea. In its early days after its foundation in 1945, the Union had well more than a million members, compared to its current membership of about 200,000 to 250,000. Its influence has been reduced since the economic reforms of the early 2000s.

The post of the chairperson is usually conferred to the most powerful woman in North Korea. Previous chairpersons include Kim Sung-ae, the wife of the country's former leader Kim Il-sung. The current chair is Jang Chun-sil.

The Union runs a publishing house that publishes a monthly magazine called Korean Woman.

History
The North Korean branch of the Union, the North Korea Democratic Women's League, was established on 18 November 1945 as part of an effort by the North Korea Bureau of the Communist Party of Korea to enroll as many people as possible as members of communist-controlled mass organizations in the northern part of the Korean Peninsula. It was the first mass organization founded with a particular segment of the society in mind. Its initial task was to gather spontaneously formed regional women's organizations under its control. The Union held its first congress on 10 May 1946. At that time, it had 800,000 members in branches in 12 cities, 89 counties, and 616 townships. By the end of 1946, almost one in five women of the country were Union members as membership had risen to 1,030,000.

At its inception, the Union worked to enact laws regarding equality of the sexes as well as to bring women into politics. When the North Korean local elections of 1946, first democratic elections in the country, approached, many men opposed women running for People's Committee. In response, Kim Il-sung enhanced the role of the Union. Some of the political goals of the Union had to do with supporting the communists rather than specifically focusing on women's issues. The Union platform consisted of supporting the Provisional People's Committee for North Korea and Kim Il-sung for leadership of the country, as well as opposing "fascism", "traitors", feudal customs and superstition. Nominally, the Union represented the whole Peninsula but in reality it had little connections with women in the south.

By 1947, the Union had 1.5 million members. The vast majority of them, some 73 percent, were peasants while 5.3 percent were workers, 0.97 percent were intellectuals, and the remaining 20 percent included all others, such as housewives.

The North and South branches became merged on 20 April 1951. Official North Korean histories date the origins of the present organization to either December 1926 or January 1951, although both of these accounts are disputed. More recently, the Union has succeeded in increasing the number of women in manufacturing jobs. The early 2000s economic reforms, which allowed people to pursue profits, weakened the ideological reach of the Union, whose membership of housewives were now busy in the marketplace. Despite this, it remains one of the most important mass organizations in the country.

At the Union's Sixth Congress on 17–18 November 2016, the name was changed to the Socialist Women's Union of Korea.

Organization
Membership is reserved for those who are not members of the Workers' Party of Korea or any other mass organization, which is the case for women who do not work outside their home. This feature of the Union makes it unique worldwide. This practice was adopted in the 1960s. Early on, membership was reserved to women between the ages of 18 and 61. Nowadays, women between the ages of 31 and 60 are eligible for membership, although if a woman marries and becomes a housewife, she is eligible regardless of age. Lately, even retirees have been forced to participate in its activities. Officially, the Union represents women who are not members in any other mass organizations, but in reality it is used to pass on decisions made by the government of North Korea and for political mobilization.

There is a committee affiliated with the Union for every administrative division of North Korea, all the way from ri (village) to province level. The Union has some 200,000–250,000 members. Under the Taean work system, there is a Union representative under the workplace Chief Secretary, who in turn is responsible to the workplace Party Committee.

The Central Committee of the Union holds plenary sessions twice a year. The Union is a member of the popular front Democratic Front for the Reunification of Korea.

The Union runs a publishing house, Chosǒn Yǒsǒngsa(조선녀성사), which, since September 1946, has published its organ Korean Woman. It started appearing regularly in 1947 and was published monthly until 1982 when publication became bimonthly.

Chairpersons

The post of the chairperson of the Union has traditionally been conferred to the most powerful woman in North Korea.

The first chairperson of the North Korean Central Committee of the Union was Pak Chong-ae. Its vice chairperson was Ahn Sin-ho. Under Pak, who served until 1965, the Union was not unlike women's organizations elsewhere in the world. It was only later that it attained totalitarian features.

Pak was followed by Kim Ok-sun, wife of the former guerrilla Choe Kwang. When her husband was purged in 1969, Kim was also deposed.

She was followed by Kim Sung-ae, the second wife of North Korean leader Kim Il-sung and former vice chairperson of the Union, in 1972. She gave the Union its current, totalitarian form. It is possible that she used her position to promote her sons Kim Pyong-il and Kim Yong-il to succeed Kim Il-sung, as opposed to Kim Jong-il from Kim Il-sung's first marriage. The Union lost much of its importance after Kim Jong-il managed to succeed his father, and Kim Sung-ae resigned her post on 25 April 1998.

It was thought that Kim Jong-il would appoint his own wife, Ko Yong-hui, following the precedent of his father, but this did not happen. Kim Sung-ae was followed by Chon Yon-ok. The current chairperson is Jang Chun-sil. Jang's predecessor since October 2000, was Pak Sun-hui (who is the daughter of Pak Chong-ae). The current vice chairpersons are Hong Son-ok, Jong Myong-hui, and Wang Ok-hwan. The vice director is Pak Chang-suk.

See also

All-China Women's Federation
General Federation of Trade Unions of Korea
Kimilsungist-Kimjongilist Youth League
Politics of North Korea
Workers' Party of Korea
Women in North Korea
Women in the North Korean Revolution

Notes

References

Works cited

Further reading

External links

Women's organizations based in North Korea
1945 establishments in Korea
Organizations established in 1945
Women's wings of communist parties
Workers' Party of Korea
Women's rights in North Korea